Janet Morin (born 25 September 1975) is a Canadian gymnast. She competed in six events at the 1992 Summer Olympics.

References

External links
 

1975 births
Living people
Canadian female artistic gymnasts
Olympic gymnasts of Canada
Gymnasts at the 1992 Summer Olympics
Sportspeople from Fredericton
Commonwealth Games medallists in gymnastics
Commonwealth Games gold medallists for Canada
Gymnasts at the 1990 Commonwealth Games
20th-century Canadian women
21st-century Canadian women
Medallists at the 1990 Commonwealth Games